Elsa Cayo (born 1951 in Lima, Peru) is a Peruvian filmmaker. 

Her work is included in the collections of the Museum of Modern Art, New York, the Musée national des beaux-arts du Québec and the National Gallery of Canada.

References

1951 births
Peruvian women artists
Peruvian film directors
Living people